Spigelia genuflexa is a species of annual herb of the family Loganiaceae from Bahia state, Brazil, which was described in 2011. It is unusual in that the stems bend down after flowering to deposit the seeds in the soil (geocarpy).

Description

Spigelia genuflexa shows two growth forms. The stems are somewhat red-coloured, and have 4 to 6 prominent ribs running down from the leaf bases.

Ecology

It flowers during the rainy season, and almost disappears during the dry season. It is able to self-pollinate, with anthesis lasting less than a day. After pollination, the plant stem bends, and in the lower growth form, deposits the seeds in the soil; the taller growth form remains some distance above the soil surface.

Taxonomy
Spigelia genuflexa was discovered on land owned by Alex Popovkin in 2009, by Popovkin's "house help" José Carlos Mendes Santos. The specific epithet  is a reference to the plant's tendency to bend down after flowering, from the Latin  (cf. genuflexion). The authors proposed that the species should be listed as Data Deficient according to the criteria of the IUCN Red List. Popovkin is a Russian emigre and amateur botanist who has fulfilled a long-held dream to study plants in the tropics. It is one of sixty species which make up the poorly-studied Neotropical genus Spigelia, but does not appear particularly close to any other species.

References

External links
 

Loganiaceae
Flora of Brazil
Plants described in 2011